Eran Rosenbaum (born 26 August 1992) is an Israeli footballer who plays as a midfielder. He currently plays for Hapoel Umm al-Fahm.

References

Profile page in Maccabi Haifa website

1992 births
Living people
Israeli Jews
Israeli footballers
Maccabi Haifa F.C. players
Sektzia Ness Ziona F.C. players
Hapoel Nof HaGalil F.C. players
Hapoel Ra'anana A.F.C. players
Ironi Nesher F.C. players
Maccabi Herzliya F.C. players
Hapoel Marmorek F.C. players
Hapoel Umm al-Fahm F.C. players
Israeli Premier League players
Liga Leumit players
People from Zikhron Ya'akov
Association football midfielders